The Market Weighton Canal ran  from the Humber Estuary to its terminus near Market Weighton. It gained its Act of Parliament in 1772 and opened in 1782. The  closest to Market Weighton was abandoned in 1900 and the right of navigation through Weighton lock was lost in 1971. However, as of 2002 the lock was passable and the canal usable up to the junction with the River Foulness where silt has made it impassable. Also there is no right of navigation under the M62 motorway bridge to the north of Newport.

History
The canal was conceived as part of a wider scheme to drain the low-lying land and fens between the River Humber and Market Weighton. Some  of land were threatened by flooding, both from rain and from water flowing into the area from a larger catchment covering , including the East Yorkshire Wolds, which border the area to the east. Before the scheme, most of the lower area was marshland, while the upper area suffered from waterlogging, and was only suitable for grazing of animals. In 2012 the Market Weighton Drainage Board amalgamated with the neighbouring Lower Ouse Internal Drainage Board to form the Ouse and Humber Drainage Board. Along with its main tributary, the River Foulness which is managed and maintained by the Ouse and Humber Drainage Board, the canal is responsible for the land drainage and flood risk management of this heavily modified, man made landscape.

The first scheme was for a line from the Humber to Wholsea, near Sod House lock, with a branch to Pocklington and another to Weighton. It was proposed in October 1765, and again in August 1767. By April 1771, it had become a navigable drain, and by December, the branch to Pocklington had been dropped. The scheme eventually put before Parliament was for a new cut from Market Weighton to the River Foulness, which would be straightened from the junction to the Humber. The channel would be used as a canal and as a drain.

The scheme was authorised by an Act of Parliament of 21 May 1772, entitled, "An Act for draining and preserving certain Commons, Low Grounds, and Carrs, in the parish of Market Weighton, and other adjacent parishes in the East Riding of the County of York; and for making a navigable Cut or Canal, from Market Weighton to the River Humber." The Act did not include powers to raise capital, as a group of people had agreed to finance the initial construction, while ongoing revenue was to be provided by a tax on landowners who benefited from the drainage and by the enclosing of common land, in addition to the normal tolls. The engineer appointed to oversee the work was a Mr. Whitworth, and was managed by a committee of Drainage Commissioners.

The canal was completed by 1782, and the main traffic consisted on agricultural produce and bricks, including Walling Fen bricks, which were fine, white and durable. Because of the dual purpose of drainage and navigation, water levels in relation to the land surface were strictly controlled by the terms of the enabling Act. There was inevitable conflict between the two functions, with the navigation requiring higher water levels than the drainage functions required. A number of brickworks were established along the canal in the Newport area, and it was a commercial success.

Decline
As with many others, the arrival of railways in the area started the decline of the canal. The York to Market Weighton Line opened in 1847, and the subsequent loss of income resulted in the condition of the canal deteriorating, to the extent that the commissioners sought an Act of Parliament in 1900 to abandon the canal as a navigation, and although the section above Sod House lock was abandoned in that year, the commercial carrying of bricks continued until the 1950s. This traffic was carried in Humber sloops. The condition of the canal continued to deteriorate until the formation of the Market Weighton Drainage Board in 1934, an internal drainage board under the terms of the Land Drainage Act 1930.

The lower section of the canal, including Weighton Lock, (also called Humber Lock), which provides access to the River Humber, was abandoned in 1971, but when they heard that the lock was likely to be demolished, the Market Weighton Civic Trust moved quickly to have the whole structure listed as an ancient monument and their action, together with public pressure resulted in the lock being repaired and reopened. Further repairs and an overhaul of the structure were carried out in 1994 by the National Rivers Authority at a cost of £1.5 million, and although there is no public right of navigation on the waterway, access is possible by arrangement with the Environment Agency, who currently own it.

Drainage
During the 1960s, the area was affected by flooding, as a result of heavy rainfall, and the decision was taken to convert the River Foulness and the canal into a highland carrier drain. This involved raising the level of the banks, making the main channel wider and deeper, and creating storage areas for floodwater on both sides of the canal at Broomfleet. This work was undertaken by the river authority. The drainage board built six pumping stations between 1975 and 1979. Improvements to the drainage channels brought the cost up to £839,000, although 70% of this was provided by grants. In the 1980s, a £1 million scheme resulted in further improvements to the drainage works, and two more pumping stations were built, at Crabley and Skelfleet Cloughs.

When the Weighton Lock sluices were converted to electro-mechanical operation in 1971, water levels in the canal could be raised without adversely affecting the drainage functions. Around 80% of the water entering the catchment leaves it via the Weighton Lock sluice. Water in the north-west of the catchment flows into the River Foulness and the canal by gravity, whereas water in the south-east is managed by pumping stations, which pump into the canal. Two of the nine pumping stations operated by the drainage board pump directly into the River Humber at Crabley Creek. The canal is tide-locked, as water levels in the Humber exceed those in the canal for much of the tide cycle, and water only drains out of the system at lower states of the tide. About half the drainage catchment lies below the level of high water on the Humber, and so the drainage function is vital to the livelihood of the area.

The route
The navigation starts at Weighton Lock, which is bi-directional, due to the tidal range of the River Humber. Above Sandholme Landing, the canal is joined by the River Foulness entering from the left, and about  further on lies the derelict Sod House lock, the current head of navigation. Much of the canal beyond has been filled in, although drainage channels closely follow its route. There were two more locks, Mill lock and Holme Ings lock, and the canal terminated at Canal Head, about  further on, and  short of the town of Market Weighton. A short branch, the Holme Canal, turned off to the left immediately above Holme Ings lock, and remains in water. Above the junction with the River Foulness, the channel is heavily silted and navigation is difficult in all but the smallest boats.

Points of interest

See also

Canals of the United Kingdom
History of the British canal system

Bibliography

References

External links

Canals in the East Riding of Yorkshire
Canals opened in 1782
1782 establishments in England
Market Weighton